Famous above all for the iconic sculpture La Marseillaise on the Arc de Triomphe de l’Étoile, François Rude was born in Dijon on 4 January 1781, the son of a coppersmith/locksmith. Apprenticed to his father, an injury made him unsuitable for forge-work, leading to his attending François Devosges's famous École de Dessin in Dijon where he was soon to show his artistic talent. He developed a relationship with Louis Frémiet, under whose patronage he began to study in 1805 with Pierre Cartellier in Paris at the studio of Edme Gaulle. By 1809 his work began to be noticed, winning him several awards. In 1815, having saved enough money, he left Paris for Rome, but due to political conditions, he ended up in Brussels once again living with the Frémiets. Whilst in Brussels he married Sophie Frémiet, an accomplished painter and they were to become a formidable force in the art world. In Brussels he executed his first bust of Louis David, gaining him much notice. They returned to Paris in 1827 where they remained until his death on 3 November 1855.

Key

Works

Gallery of images

External links

 Louvre Database (French language) - Works by Rude (and some others)
 More views of the Neapolitan Fisherboy
 Views of the Arc de Triomphe
 Art on-line: François Rude
 French language site listing works by Rude, with access to large images (it may be necessary to close an advertising banner to view this page)

Recommended reading
Biography of Rude by Alexis Bertrand. Libraire de l'Art. Paris

References

Lists of works of art